Avocettina bowersii is an eel in the family Nemichthyidae (snipe eels). It was described by Samuel Garman in 1899. It is a marine, deep water-dwelling eel which is known from California, U.S.A.; Peru, and Chile. It dwells at a depth range of 92–641 metres, although the type specimen was collected from a depth of 2,692 metres.

A. bowersii is believed to be a semelparous species.

References

Nemichthyidae
Fish described in 1899